Brachycentrus appalachia is a species of humpless casemaker caddisfly in the family Brachycentridae. It is found in North America.

References

External links

 

Trichoptera
Articles created by Qbugbot
Insects described in 1984